The 1992 VMI Keydets football team was an American football team that represented the Virginia Military Institute (VMI) as a member of the Southern Conference (SoCon) during the 1992 NCAA Division I-AA football season. In their fourth year under head coach Jim Shuck, the team compiled an overall record of 3–8, with a mark of 1–6 in conference play, placing seventh in the SoCon.

Schedule

References

VMI
VMI Keydets football seasons
VMI Keydets football